Events from the year 1557 in India.

Events
 The Sur Empire comes to an end

Births

Deaths

See also

 Timeline of Indian history

 
India